The women's 200 metres at the 2017 World Championships in Athletics was held at the London Olympic Stadium on 8 and .

Summary
Defending champion Dafne Schippers from the Netherlands competed while some of her main competitors did not. Elaine Thompson, this event's silver medallist at the 2015 World Championships and gold medallist at the 2016 Olympics, did not compete. Also missing was Tori Bowie, the world leader and 100 metres gold medallist at these World Championships. Schippers' strongest challengers of the remaining athletes were considered to be Marie-Josée Ta Lou from the Ivory Coast, who won the silver medal in the 100 metres at these championships; Shaunae Miller-Uibo from the Bahamas, who won the gold medal in the 400 metres at the 2016 Olympic Games; and the U.S. athletes.

In the final, shorter sprinters like Ta Lou and Dina Asher-Smith from Great Britain were out of the blocks faster. By her fourth stride, Schippers was into her running motion and gaining with fewer strides than her shorter competitors. By the end of the turn, Schippers had a metre lead on Ta Lou and more than a two-metre lead on Asher-Smith. Down the stretch, Ta Lou gained ground on the lead, while behind them the tall Miller-Uibo was moving past Asher-Smith. Still, Schippers' lead held up for the win in 22.05 seconds. Ta Lou took the silver medal in a 22.08 second national record, and Miller-Uibo closed even faster for the bronze medal.

Records
Before the competition records were as follows:

The following records were set at the competition:

Qualification standard
The standard to qualify automatically for entry was 23.10.

Schedule
The event schedule, in local time (UTC+1), was as follows:

Results

Heats
The first round took place on 8 August in seven heats as follows:

The first three in each heat ( Q ) and the next three fastest ( q ) qualified for the semifinals. The overall results were as follows:

Semifinals
The semifinals took place on 10 August in three heats as follows:

The first two in each heat ( Q ) and the next two fastest ( q ) qualified for the final. The overall results were as follows:

Final
The final took place on 11 August at 21:50. The wind was +0.8 metres per second and the results were as follows (photo finish):

References

200
200 metres at the World Athletics Championships
Women's sport in London